Dark Invitation to Armageddon is the second album by thrash metal band The Scourger. It was released on January 30, 2008, and later re-released as an international version with bonus tracks on March 14, 2008, via Cyclone Records. The album's first single, "Never Bury the Hatchet", landed on the national Finnish charts at #9 in July 2007.

Track listing

"Lex Talionis" (Ari Tarvainen) – 1:26
"No Redemption" (Ariane Gottberg, Hurskainen, Tarvainen) – 4:40
"In the Hour of Ruin" (Gottberg, Tarvainen) – 5:57
"To Tame a Life" (Gottberg, Hurskainen, Tarvainen) – 4:37
"Never Bury the Hatchet" (Gottberg, Tarvainen) – 4:02
"Deformed Reality" (Gottberg, Hurskainen, Tarvainen) – 4:28
"Dark Invitation to Armageddon" (Gottberg, Hurskainen, Tarvainen) – 5:18
"Reign in Bestial Sin" (Gottberg, Hurskainen, Tarvainen) – 5:25
"Beyond Judas" (Gottberg, Hurskainen, Tarvainen) – 5:01
"Cranium Crush" (Gottberg, Luttinen, Tarvainen) – 4:17
"Last Nail to the Coffin" (Gottberg, Hurskainen, Tarvainen) – 6:47
"Vicious Circle" – 4:15
"Hatehead [Live]" – 3:35

Tracks 12 and 13 are bonus tracks from the international version.

Personnel 
Jari Hurskainen – vocals
Seppo Tarvainen – drums
Jani Luttinen – guitars
Antti Wirman – guitars
Kimmo Kammonen – bass
Aaro Seppovaara – producing, engineering, mixing, mastering
Petri Majuri – mastering

References

2008 albums
The Scourger albums